Al-Khair Foundation (AKF) is an international Muslim aid NGO based in the United Kingdom, and is the third largest Muslim charity in the UK. It was established in 2003, and aims to deliver aid to the poor and vulnerable, as well as education for the Muslim community. It specialises in humanitarian support, international development, emergency aid and disaster relief in some of the world's most deprived areas.

Al-Khair Foundation aims to tackle issues prevalent in the UK, such as unemployment, education, women's empowerment and domestic violence.

History 

The name of the foundation, ‘Al-Khair’, is translated to mean ‘goodness’ in Arabic.  The AKF began as an Islamic school in Croydon in 2003. It evolved into a service organisation to the UK community first, with an initial focus on education, and also charity work. The founder of the AKF School  is the Imam, Imam Qasim. The Islamic school began with five enrolled pupils. The sports hall was previously a converted warehouse and the school itself was previously an office. By 2013, the school grew into a  primary and secondary school with over 350 pupils. AKF then began to build schools overseas for orphans and children from underprivileged communities. This led to AKF's work with widows and vulnerable women, and then to the establishment of the AKF shelters. Eventually AKF launched their water aid and livelihood projects, as well as the AKF medical aid programmes.

In 2005, AKF launched their first Overseas Disaster Relief venture to provide emergency aid during the Kashmir earthquake. That October, and in the winter months which followed, AKF's relief teams provided survivors with medicine, food, shelter kits and moral support. Ever since, AKF has undertaken emergency aid missions all over the world. In this year Al-Khair school also passed their first Ofsted inspection.

In 2007, AKF established their first shelter project in Kashmir, and two years later AKF bought IQRA TV, a free-to-air channel available on Sky TV. IQRA TV's educational Islamic-based programmes including 'Live with IQ', 'IQRA with IQRA', and 'Questions and Answers'.

In 2010, AKF was a founding member of the Muslim Charities Forum.

AKF has supported the victims of many earthquakes, including the Haiti earthquake and Pakistan floods of 2010, the horn of Africa famine relief, and the Japan earthquake of 2011. Their work in Haiti was recognised by the United Nations in 2010, and they were the only UK Muslim charity working with survivors on the ground in the Japan earthquake of 2011.

In 2012, AKF created their first official partnership - a memorandum of understanding with Malaysian Red Crescent.

In July 2015, AKF also signed a memorandum of understanding with the UN to facilitate education for Gazan children.

In 2014, the revenue made by AKF was 21.4 million.

The Foundation aims to save lives in emergencies and provide for disaster zones with medical aid, food shelter. It also aims to help the needy by adopting practical ways to root out poverty from the world through relief and development programmes in South Asia, the Middle-East, East Africa and United Kingdom.

Activities 
AKF's activities are categorised into the following: sustainable development and aid, awareness raising, working with partners and advocacy.

Sustainable development & aid 
AKF provides relief to help those affected or displaced by disasters and conflict. However, AKF also enable vulnerable people to become in a position in which they can help themselves in the long term. This is through the use of sustainable development programmes, which range from livelihood projects to long-term water aid projects. Notable ongoing work by AKF also includes work to prevent future floods in Pakistan through the use of infrastructure relief, rehabilitation and aid projects. Such projects extend beyond the basic provision of aid to impoverished areas through the creation or reconstruction of basic public services which are damaged by natural or man-made disasters.

Awareness raising 
Al-Khair Schools aim to educate and encourage children on how they can engage with and give back to their communities. AKF is conscious in advocating the needs of the wider community, through local action in order to make a difference.

Partnerships 
AKF works nationally and globally with more than 30 partners, including the following: Qatar Red Crescent, UNRWA, Kenya Red Cross, United Muslim Relief, UNHCR, Global One, Afghan Aid, Tayyab trust, Christian Aid, UMR  and Islamic Help  and many more. AKF is also a member of the Coalition of Muslim NGOs  and participated in a Christian-Muslim Humanitarian partnerships workshop, hosted by the Lutheran world federation in Jordan in 2013.  AKF is also regularly involved in attending Aidex conferences and events.

Advocacy 
AKF aims to advocate for global issues, which its members believe requires more than donations.  AKF also aims to promote interfaith dialogue and harmonious relations, and is actively involved in annual conferences to engage religious leaders and people of many backgrounds to promote tolerance and understanding .

Senior management 
The founder and chairman of Al-Khair Foundation, Imam Qasim Rashid Ahmad, is largely involved in AKF's work in the UK and internationally. Before founding AKF, he had graduated in the Islamic sciences and was an imam and community/faith leader at the Croydon Mosque. He also worked as a counsellor and teacher for reforming prisoners for nearly a decade at Her Majesty's Prisons. Imam Qasim established and oversaw many of the charity's aid and development programmes to date. He is also the CEO of IQRA TV.

Dr Jafer Qureshi   a senior consultant psychiatrist based in Birmingham and is Al Khair Foundation's trustee. He also serves on the board of Muslim Aid Sweden and India.

In April 2015, AKF appointed a new chief executive officer, Saif Ahmad.  He has worked with local and central government for over 30 years, as well as in the private and voluntary sectors. He was formerly the a CEO of the UK charities Muslim Aid and Islamic Help, and was also the founder of the charities- Faith Regen foundation, MADE  and Global One. He has also been a member of the National Young People's Learning Committee of the Learning and Skills Council, the Regeneration Practitioners’ Group of the Home Office, and the Policy Action Team of the Social Exclusion Unit of the Cabinet Office.

Locations 
In the United Kingdom, AKF has office in London (East Croydon and Bounds Green), Bolton, Glasgow, Sheffield, Leicester and Blackburn.

The group also operates in Bangladesh, Somaliland, Kenya, Japan, India, Pakistan, Palestine, Sierra Leone, Albania, Myanmar, Philippines, Afghanistan, Haiti and Chile.

Programmes 
 Emergency relief for disasters- dispatch of relief teams and charity partners to deliver aid to survivors on the ground (clean water, food, shelter and medication)
 Water aid- provision of clean water to communities in several countries
 Medical aid- provision of disability support, disaster medical care, hygiene and sanitation kits, health, maternity care through mobile medical units
 Shelter- provision of temporary shelter in tents or camps for internally displaced people
 Education- build schools and provide vocational training, improve literacy among children and adults in Britain and in disadvantaged communities 
 Livelihood support- provision of support, and vocational training for poverty relief
 Seasonal & religious- Food Distribution in the holy month of Ramadan, and during Eid ul-Adha
 Support for vulnerable people and communities- Funding sponsorship programs to support international orphans, widows and vulnerable elderly people, as well as community support projects to aid female victims of domestic violence in Britain.

Recent campaign appeals 
 Refugee Rescue Appeal Europe 2015 
 South Asia Earthquake appeal
 Schools4Gaza
 Asia Flood Appeal
 Rohingya Appeal
 Nepal Appeal
 Water Appeal

Awards and nominations 
 Al-Khair Foundation was given the award for the "Most Successful Fundraiser of the Year 2011" by the national charity fundraising platform 'Just Giving'.

References

External links

Islamic charities based in the United Kingdom
Development charities based in the United Kingdom
Organizations established in 2003